Banhong Township is a rural township in Cangyuan Va Autonomous County, Yunnan, China.

Name
The word Banhong is transliteration in Dai language. "Ban" means level ground and "Hong" means banyan.

History
Historically, Banhong was a tribal settlement. In 1891, the Qing government bestowed on Hu Yushan the title "Tudusi". On June 18, 1941, the west of the Banhong Village belonged to Burma. After the establishment of the Communist State, Banhong District was established. The last Tusi is Hu Zhonghua. On January 25, 1960, China and Burma sign bilateral boundary division agreements, the boundary of the two countries was determined. In 1968 it was renamed Banhong Commune and then Wuyi Commune in the next year. It was upgraded to a township in 1988.

Administrative division
As of 2017, the township is divided into 6 villages: Banhong, Mangku, Gongkan, Fugong, Banmo, and Nanban.

Geography

The Mangku River and Xinya River, tributaries of the Nu River, flow through the township.

Economy
Natural rubber, cassava, tea, walnuts and rapeseed are major cash crops.

Attractions
Nangun River Natural Protection Area is a national nature reserve in the township.

Education
The township has 6 primary schools and 1 middle school.

Transportation
The Nancang Road passes across the township.

References

Divisions of Cangyuan Va Autonomous County